Priit Aavik (born 7 November 1994) is an Estonian swimmer. He represent Saaremaa at the Island Games since 2009.

References

1994 births
Living people
Estonian male backstroke swimmers
Estonian male butterfly swimmers
Estonian male medley swimmers
Sportspeople from Kuressaare